is a private women's university in Nagoya, Aichi, Japan with campus at Mizuho-ku. The predecessor of the school was founded in 1915, and it was chartered as a junior college in 1950.

References

External links
 Official website

Educational institutions established in 1915
Private universities and colleges in Japan
Universities and colleges in Nagoya
Women's universities and colleges in Japan
1915 establishments in Japan